The Battle of the Puig of 1237, also known as the Battle of the Puig de Santa Maria, the Battle of the Puig de Enesa, or the Battle of the Puig de Cepolla was a battle of the Iberian Reconquista and of the Aragonese Conquest of Valencia.

The battle took place in August 1237, pitting the forces of the Crown of Aragon, under the command o  Bernat Guillem I d'Entença, against the forces of the Taifa of Valencia, under the command of Zayyan ibn Mardanish. The battle resulted in a decisive Aragonese victory and the conquest of Valencia by the crown of Aragon.

Context 

The Almohades had successfully integrated the Emirates of the Iberian Peninsula together with those in North Africa into a somewhat unstable political entity. The Almohad governors of Balansiya, Zayd Abu Abd Allah Muhammad and Zayd Abu Zayd were able to act with complete autonomy, including giving titles of kingship. They never exercised this right by coined money or renouncing their fealty to the Almohad Caliphate or to its emperor. After the Almohad defeat at the Battle of Las Navas de Tolosa, the empire disintegrated and fractured in smaller kingdoms called taifas. The most important of these were the Nasrid Kingdom of Granada or Emirate of Granada, the Hafsid Taifa of Tunisia, the Banu Zian Taifa of Algeria, and Marinid controlled Morocco.

In 1224, James I of Aragon called on his nobles from Aragon and Catalonia to initiate the conquest of Muslim controlled Balansiya, entering the area through Teruel. Zayd Abu Zayd promptly asked the Aragonese monarch for a truce which he accepted in return for one fifth of the income from Balansiya and Mursiyya. During the summer of 1225, James I attempted to take the castle at Peñíscola by laying siege to it. That siege was ultimately unsuccessful as the Aragonese nobles abandoned it.

By 1228, an indigenous Valencian-Muslim rebellion led by Ibn Hud, gained enough support to take the city of Madina Mursiyya and to dominate the regions of Orihuela, Dénia, Gandia, Xàtiva, and Al-Yazirat Suquar. The rebellion further laid siege to Balensiya itself, albeit unsuccessfully due to the menace of a relief force from the Kingdom of Castile. Ibn Hud retired to Madina Mursiyya without taking Balensiya.

The pact between the Christian king and Abū Zayd caused many Muslims to switch their allegiance in favor of Zayyan ibn Mardanish, the grandson of Abu al-Hajjaj, thinking that Abū Zayd had betrayed them and abandoned Islam. Abū Zayd fled Valencia and headed north while Zayyan triumphantly entered the city in the winter of 1229 without proclaiming himself king. From Madina Mursiyya, the anit-Almohad rebel, Ibn Hud, laid siege to Valencia, pressuring Zayyan into abandoning the city.

James I of Aragon, who had recently conquered Majorca in 1229, decided to try once again to conquer the Taifa of Valencia.

The Campaign for Valencia 
In 1235, the Crown of Aragon was conducting attacks in the area around Balansiya at Albalat and Cullera, but the Christian army was forced to retire. On 25 June 1235, James I of Aragon laid siege to the castle at Foios on the outskirts of Balansiya. The Muslims fighting for Zayyan ibn Mardanish, who were forced to retire to the south, destroyed the fortifications at El Puig.

James I met with the dethroned Emir Abū Zayd in Teruel to establish a new pact between them. Instead of his signature, the document was stamped with Abū Zayd's crest, an eagle and the Castilian motto: Sciello de Ceit Buceit nieto de [Emir al] Momenin. The date was set at 28 May 1236 and it stipulated that a fourth of the territory of Valencia would go to Abū Zayd upon the conquest and that Abū Zayd and his descendants would declare themselves the vassals of James I and of any children he had with Violant of Hungary. It was at this time that Abu Zayd had converted to Christianity and adopted the name Vicens Bellvis. He married a woman from Zaragoza named María Ferrandia. Some sources incorrectly cite one "Dominga López".

In the documents from 1236, the Catalan and Aragonese forces are already preparing for their eventual attack on Balensiya. On 13 October 1236, the cohorts of Monzón attempted the conquest. On a document dated to 28 October issued in Lérida, James I proclaimed that once the city of Valencia was conquered, he would donate to its church, saying: "apud Montesonum in curia generali quam convocavimus pro facienda exercitus contra mauros". The same day he promised to turn the city's central mosque into a Catholic church. On 13 November, James I issued a decree stating that once the city was taken, the church of Valencia would become a dependent of the See of Tarragona. In further preparation for Valencian life after the conquest, James I decreed that the provincial master for the Order of the Temple would have the power to mint coinage in its territories.

The Campaign in Palancia 
After the Siege of Burriana and the Siege of Cullera, James I of Aragon positioned himself for the final push into the Province of Valencia. He gathered his forces at Monzón on 28 October 1236 where he gained approval from Pope Gregory IX to name the conquest an official Crusade by order of Papal Bull on 2 February 1237. After encamping in Montpellier from the end of 1236 through the beginnings of 1237, the army concentrated on Teruel and followed the Palancia River, taking La Vall d'Uixó, Nules, and Almenara. They further took the towns of Bétera, Paterna, Moncada, and finally El Puig on 25 June 1237 which was situated close to the city of Balensiya.

The Aragonese forces rebuilt the fortifications of El Puig, building a wall of mud and stone that stretched all the way to the sea. After two months, the defensive works were ready and the castle was occupied by a garrison of 100 knights and many more peasants commanded by Bernat Guillem I d'Entença, a relative of the king.

According to the Muslim historian Ibn Khaldun, from 16 September to 4 September 1236,(Reverse Time Travel) the Christians had attacked the Saracens, building seven encampments, two of which were concentrated against Balansiya, Al-Yazirat Suquar, and Xàtiva. While Castilian forces took the city of Córdoba under the command of the Castilian king, James I took power over the majority of the Castilians in his area of operations. After building a castle at Enesa to facilitate his besieging of Balansiya, he returned home.

The battle
Zayyan ibn Mardanish mustered the people of Xàtiva and the Júcar and advanced towards El Puig. According to the chronicles of James I, his force numbered around 600 cavalry units and 11,000 peasants or foot soldiers. He attacked the Aragonese forces on 15 August 1237. According to the Muslim historian Ahmed Mohammed al-Maqqari, the attack occurred shortly after James I had left El Puig for Huesca.

Ibn al-Abbar, who had been Abū Zayd's secretary when he presided over Valencia, became Zayyan's scribe after Aby Zayd left the city. He recorded the battle as having happened around noon. The Muslim Almohad forces under Zayyan were routed, and a great many of their soldiers were slain in the action. Amongst the Almohad dead was the preacher Aburrebii ibn Salim Elcolaí "the wise". When news reached James I of Aragon of the victory, he traveled to the site of the battle, where he remained a few days, after which time he returned to Aragon.

This decisive Aragonese victory had a great influence over the overall fight for the control of Balensiya. After the battle, the number of Christian forces in the region swelled, forcing many Muslims to flee south.

Consequences 
Whilst James I of Aragon was in Aragon, the commander of the Aragonese army at El Puig,  Bernat Guillem I d'Entença, died of wounds received during the action. This greatly disheartened the nobles, especially those of Aragon.

At the council of magnates, Blasco I of Alagonia, speaking on behalf of many other barons, voiced that it would be better to evacuate El Puig and temporarily abandon the gains made during that portion of the campaign.

James I refused to follow the advice of the nobles and proceeded to continue the campaign. The king again returned to El Puig de Santa Maria on 24 January 1238, bringing with him the son of Bernat Guillem d'Entença, Guillem d'Entença who was about 10 to 11 years of age at the time. In front of all the nobles present and the representatives of the military orders, the king knighted Guillem and pronounced him the heir to all the titles and lands of his father. He further provisionally appointed Berenguer de Entenza as a captain of the castle.

The gestures made by the king did little to halt the opposition to the continuation of the campaign. On the contrary, once knowing that the king was en route, a large portion of the garrison at Puig met secretly and agreed to abandon their position. One of the Dominican friars who resided in the garrison denounced the plot against the king.  The following day, he gave a sermon to the nobles of the castle who there after promised to continue the fight until victory.

Once back at the Puig, James I received a message from Zayyan offering all the castles from the Turia River to Tortosa and Teruel, the construction of a lavish palace for the king in Saïda Province and the payment of ten thousand besantes annually in return for James' promise to abandon his attack of the capital. James I of Aragon responded negatively to the offer, citing the changed circumstances, and proceeded with his conquest.

References 

 The information on this page was translated from its Spanish equivalent.

Bibliography 
 

 

Puig
Puig
Puig
Puig
1237 in Europe
13th century in Al-Andalus
13th century in Aragon
Puig